The Báb's house, also known as Seyed Báb's house, in the Iranian city of Shiraz, was the home of Seyed Ali Mohammad Báb, founder of Bábism religion where he openly proselyted his religion for the first time.

This house, which later became the most important Baháʼí pilgrimage in Iran,  was demolished on 1, September 1979, during the Iranian Revolution.

Destruction 
In the Kitáb-i-Aqdas Baháʼu'lláh declared this house a place for Baháʼí pilgrimage. After major renovation in 1903, under the guidance of Abdu'l-Bahá, the house became Baháʼí's main pantheon. During the next years this house was attacked by fanatics and was demolished. In 1942 the house was the subject of arson. In 1955 in the midst of a series of persecutions of Baháʼís, which took place across Iran led by Mohammad Taghi Falsafi, the building was severely damaged. In September 1979, after Iran’s 1978 revolution, the house was completely knocked down by religious fanatics.

Reaction of Baháʼí community 
Following the demolition, in a letter dated 1 October 1979, “Iran’s Baháʼí National Circle” expressed their complaint over the house’s destruction. Members of the National Circle who wrote this letter were kidnapped the next year and did not reappear.

1979-
After 1979, the religion entered a new phase when a message of the Universal House of Justice dated 20 October 1983 was released. Baháʼís were urged to become involved in the social and economic development of their communities. In 1979, 129 officially recognized Baháʼí socioeconomic development projects were begun.

The 1979 Islamic Revolution refocused the persecutions against the Baháʼí Faith. Several other Baháʼí holy sites were destroyed in the revolution's aftermath, including the house of Baháʼu'lláh at Takur (in Mazandaran), and the resting place of Muhammad-Ali Barfurushi (Quddús) in Tehran.

Many Baháʼís were killed after the Islamic Revolution with many more imprisoned, expelled from schools and workplaces, denied various benefits or denied registration for their marriages.

Since 2005, more than 1006 Baha'is have been arrested,  The list of prisoners includes six members of a former leadership group serving the community. In 2010, the seven leaders of the community wrongly sentenced to 20 years in prison, the longest term then facing any prisoner of conscience in Iran. In late 2015, reports indicated that their sentences had been belatedly reduced from 20 years to 10 years.

Other types of persecution include educational and economic discrimination; limits on the right to assemble and worship; and the dissemination of anti-Baha’i propaganda led by government news media. Attacks on Baha'is or Baha'i-owned properties, go  without prosecution, creating a sense of impunity for attackers. Since 2005, for example, at least 52 incidents of arson were committed against Baha’i properties, crimes for which no one was arrested.

See also 
 Mullá ʻAlíy-i-Bastámí
 Baháʼí Faith and the unity of humanity
 ʻAbdu'l-Bahá
 New world order (Baháʼí)

Further reading

References

External links
ʻAbdu'l-Bahá on Unity and Peace
Shoghi Effendi on Unity

Bábism
Bahá'í central figures
Bahá'í Faith in Iran
Humanity
Demolished buildings and structures in Iran
Buildings and structures demolished in 1979